Khwaja Ghulam Rasool Koreja (born 21 October 1970) is a Pakistani politician who served as a member of the National Assembly of Pakistan, from June 2013 to May 2018.

Early life
He was born on 21 October 1970.

Political career

He was elected to the National Assembly of Pakistan as a candidate of Pakistan Peoples Party (PPP) from Constituency NA-192 (Rahim Yar Khan-I) in the 2013 Pakistani general election. He received 80,823 votes and defeated Makhdoom Syed Ahmed Alam Anwar, a candidate of Pakistan Muslim League (N) (PML-N).

In October 2017, he was appointed as chairperson of the standing committees of the National Assembly on narcotics control. Mr. Syed Mobeen Ahmed from Pakistan Tehreek-e-Insaf defeated him in the 2018 Pakistani general election by 8000 votes.
Mr. Ghulam Rasool left Pakistan People's Party in August 2022. He met Imran Khan on Sep 15, 2022, and formally joined Pakistan Tehreek-e-Insaf.

References

Living people
1970 births
Pakistan People's Party politicians
Pakistani MNAs 2013–2018